Events in the year 2008 in Slovenia.

Incumbents
President: Danilo Türk
Prime Minister: Janez Janša to November, 2008; then Borut Pahor

Events
September21 - 2008 Slovenian parliamentary election

Date unknown
Epeka, a Slovenian association is founded.

Deaths
February 23 - Janez Drnovšek, 57, Slovenian Prime Minister (1992–2002) and President (2002–2007), cancer.
March 26 - Alojz Geržinič, composer (b. 1915)
June 5 - Misha Lajovic, 86, Slovenian-born Australian politician, Senator for New South Wales (1975–1985).
June 11 - Taras Kermauner, 78, Slovenian literary historian, philosopher and playwright.
August 25 - Pavle Kozjek, 49, Slovenian mountaineer, climbing accident.
December 16 - Zlatko Šugman, 76, Slovenian actor, illness.
December 20 - Albin Planinc, 64, Slovenian chess grandmaster, after long illness.

Arts and entertainment
In music: Slovenia in the Eurovision Song Contest 2008.

References

 
Slovenia
Years of the 21st century in Slovenia